Brigitte Schwaiger (6 April 1949 – 26 July  2010) was an Austrian author born in Freistadt, Austria.

She was the daughter of a doctor, while her great grandmother was Carola Seligmann, an opera singer who died in the Theresienstadt concentration camp.

Schwaiger attended grammar school at Freistadt until 1967 and then studied two semesters of Psychology, Germanic and Romance linguistics in Vienna. In 1968, she married a Spanish Officer, and moved with  him to Madrid and then Mallorca before divorcing him four years later. She then attended the Pedagogic Academy in Linz, where she played part-time in  cellar theatres and worked as a production  assistant  at  ORF (Österreichischer Rundfunk - Austrian  Broadcasting).

Her first  novel, Wie kommt das Salz ins Meer? (Why Is There Salt in the Sea?, 1977) became a sensational bestseller which sold several hundred thousand copies throughout the German language region. The heavily autobiographical first-person story tells of the monotony of everyday married life and of unsuccessful attempts to flee this world. In 1988 the novel was dramatised in a German  film  by Peter Beauvais, starring Nicolin Kunz and Siemen Rühaak.

Although her later works did not achieve the success of her first  novel, Fallen lassen, a report  of her experience in  psychiatry, was met with critical acclaim.

Brigitte Schwaiger was found dead in a branch of River Danube in Vienna at the End of July 2010. It probably was suicide. She often had spoken about "the shorter way" she would like to choose.

Awards
 1984 Culture Prize of the Province of Upper Austria

Works

 Wie kommt das Salz ins Meer? (Why Is There Salt in the Sea?, 1977)
 Mein spanisches Dorf (1978)
 Lange Abwesenheit (1980)
 Die Galizianerin (1982)
 Der Himmel ist süß – Eine Beichte (1984)
 Mit einem möcht' ich leben (1987) (poems)
 Liebesversuche (1989)
 Schönes Licht (1990)
 Tränen beleben den Staub (1991)
 Der rote Faden (1992)
 Jaro heißt Frühling (1994)
 Ein langer Urlaub (1997)
 Fallen lassen (2006) (describes her experience with psychiatry)

References

1949 births
2010 deaths
20th-century Austrian writers
Austrian women writers